Stephanie and Spy is a sculpture by American artist Robert Graham located in the Rolfe Hall Courtyard on the campus of the University of California, Los Angeles, in Los Angeles, California, United States. The two-part, bronze sculpture was made in 1980-81 and depicts a nude woman standing next to a horse.  Each figure stands on its own pedestal positioned about 2 feet from each other.

Description
The sculpture is made in cast bronze and depicts two figures: one is Stephanie, a nude female, and the other is Spy, a horse.  Each figure stands on its own pedestal and the pedestals are placed next to each other so the figures stand side by side, about two feet apart.  Spy stands to the proper right of Stephanie.  Both figures are looking forward. Spy's feet stand straight and parallel to each other, except for the proper left hoof which is placed slightly back from the plane of the proper right foot.  Stephanie stands straight with her arms at her sides slightly lifted away from her hips. The front of each of the pedestals are aligned despite the difference in the length of the sculpture and pedestal between the two figures.

The sculpture measurements are as follows: Stephanie (female) 61 × 7 × 11 in. (156.2 × 19.1 × 29.2 cm) and Spy (horse) 71 × 13 × 55 in. (181 × 34.9 × 139.7 cm).

Acquisition
The sculpture was gifted to UCLA by alumni Carol and Roy Doumani.

It is installed towards the center of the Rolfe Hall Courtyard on the UCLA campus, surrounded by 10 other works by Robert Graham:

 Fountain Figure I, 1983
 Fountain Figure III, 1983
 Lori, 1986
 Olympic Torso (Female), 1983
 Olympic Torso (Male), 1983
 Sasha, 1993
 Study for Column I, (Neith), 1988
 Study for Column II, (Lisa Ann), 1988
 Study for Column III, (Debbie), 1988
 Untitled (Lise), 1977

See also
Robert Graham
Cathedral of Our Lady of the Angels

References

External links
Robert Graham Studio
Hammer Museum
Murphy Sculpture Garden, Hammer Museum, UCLA

Outdoor sculptures in California
Art in Greater Los Angeles
Bronze sculptures in California
Statues in Los Angeles
Sculptures of women in California
1981 sculptures
University of California, Los Angeles buildings and structures